The Wuxi East railway station is a high-speed railway station in Wuxi, Jiangsu, People's Republic of China. It is served by the Jinghu High-Speed Railway. It is opened on June 30, 2011.

The station is by Xianfeng East Road, in Xishan, Wuxi. The station offers two ticket halls (north and south), four platforms, and daily services of trains to major cities in China.


Metro Station

Wuxi East railway station is served by a station of the same name on Line 2 of Wuxi Metro. It started operations on 28 December 2014.

Station Layout

Exits
There are four exits for this station.

See also
Wuxi railway station

References

Railway stations in Jiangsu
Railway stations in China opened in 2011
Wuxi Metro stations